Gauthamante Radham is a 2020 Indian Malayalam-language comedy-drama film written and directed by Anand Menon. The film stars Neeraj Madhav, Valsala Menon, Punya Elizabeth Bose, Renji Panicker and Hareesh Kanaran. Neeraj Madhav plays the main role named as Gauthaman, a young man who is highly interested in driving.

Plot
Gouthamante narrates his story of learning driving and how he handled the difficulties that came across his life.

The movie starts with young Gauthaman rotating the wheel of a bicycle as he is very much interested in vehicles. Gauthaman's grandmother whom he lovingly calls Muthassi  saw him most of the time spending with the toy cars and his father's cycle. Gauthaman's father Ramachandran is a very kind and compassionate person who is ready to fulfil all the wishes of his son. But Muthassi is the only one who encourages Gauthaman to take initiative to drive vehicles. As a result, his confidence level raise. They move from their village to Cochin City.

Years passed. On Gauthaman's 18th birthday, he spends most of the time arguing with his grandmother on simple issues but both share a strong bond. Muthassi took classes for neighbouring children based on stories from the Puranas (Sanatana Dharma). Gauthaman is always against her old beliefs. Ramachandran compels him to take a driving license and hearing this Gauthaman gets excited at the top level as it was his dream for years. Shibu Ashaan  is assigned to teach him driving. He is a strict as well as a funny teacher. Gauthaman finds a great personality on him on the first day of learning. Gauthaman drives well as a result without any issues. But one time hits a car while taking reverse. However his determination and courage resulted him a driving license. His family is extremely happy and his father decides to buy a car as he feels his cycle cannot always fulfil their family needs. Gauthaman selected Mitsubishi Lancer and his family agrees to it. Muthassi gives Gauthaman some money in advance.

Gauthaman is now waiting anxiously for a car to arrive in his house. However, on the day the car arrived, Gauthaman was as expected not happy, but instead gloomy as he got a small car and not the one he selected. He argues with the whole family to take back the car. But Ramachandran consoles him that Shibu Ashaan suggested the small car. Gauthaman came to know that Shibu Ashaan cheated him forgetting the credit he gave his teacher in the day of getting license. Muthassi takes care of the vehicle and names it 'Nanappan'. However Gauthaman is still not satisfied. His family shows the pride of it in the society. All plans to go for a long ride on Kunjoottan after spoiling his personal activities. Gauthaman's relatives tease him of buying a small low rated car. Gauthaman is angry on his family now. Soon, Gauthaman and his friends take the car to Munnar where they decide to trash and destroy it. However, this changes as Gauthaman tells them to stop. Once he returns home the next day, his father asks him to run a small errand. In the process of it, a biker Kalyani  breaks the mirror. Venki gets mad and they crash the car into her.
Kalyani complains to the police and they decide to compromise. Gauthaman has to deal with Kalyani's hospital expenses.
One day Gauthaman's neighbor falls fits and Gauthaman uses his small car to take him to the hospital on time. Kalyani gets angry on Gauthaman as he did not pick her call but on knowing the truth she falls for him. They both fall in love and Gauthaman's family accepts the relationship but Kalyani's father rejects him because he is from low class.

After this incident Gautham and Kalyani decide to break up their relationship. While discussing this thing with his friends , Venki reveals that he has been forced to go to gulf for work. Finally Gautham decides to take his grandmother to Rameswaram to fulfil her last wish and she dies in her car. After some time Venki departed Gautham and flee to Gulf. Gautham finally receives a letter offering a job and decides to sell Nanappan. The family then have a sad farewell to Nanappan. After some time Gautham has a job with a salary of ₹ 80000. He brings back Nanappan and Goes to Kalyani house and takes her from the house with her permission and they lived happily ever after

Cast
Neeraj Madhav as Gauthaman
Valsala Menon as Muthassi
Punya Elizabeth Bose as Kalyani, Gautaman's love interest
Renji Panicker as Ramachandran
Devi Ajith as Sreelekha
Hareesh Kanaran as Basheer
Biju Sopanam as Shibu Ashan
Basil Joseph as Venkidi Iyer
Nadiya as Nimmy
Krishnandhu as Kichu
Anand Menon as Nimmy's Boyfriend
Vishnu Govindan as Sambath Annan
Hareesh Pengan as Anirudhan
Kalabhavan Prajod as Dhuthu Francis
Liji Sivaprakash as Venkidi's Mother

Soundtrack

References

External links
 

2020 comedy-drama films
2020s Malayalam-language films
Indian comedy-drama films